Alan White (23 February 1924 – February 2003) was an English novelist and journalist. He used his experiences as a Second World War commando leader in his writings. He also wrote using the names "Alec Haig", "James Fraser" and "Alec Whitney". Under the pseudonym "Joe Balham" he wrote seven novels based on The Sweeney television series. His novel The Long Day's Dying  was made into a 1968 film directed by Peter Collinson. White wrote mysteries, as well as war and adventure novels. White died in Salisbury, Wiltshire in February 2003.

Bibliography

Novels

Written as Alan White
 The Long Day's Dying (1962) (American title: Death Finds the Day)
 The Wheel (1966)
 The Long Night's Walk (1968)
 Long Drop (1969)
 Kibbutz (1970) (American title: Possess the Land)
 Climate of Revolt (1971)
 The Long Watch (1971)
 The Long Midnight (1972)
 The Long Fuse (1973)
 Armstrong (1973)
 The Long Summer (1974)
 Death in Duplicate (1974)
 Death in Darkness (1975), as Alec Whitney for the American edition
 The Long Silence (1976)
 The Long Hand of Death (1977)
 Cassidy's Yard (1980)
 The Years of Change 1983
 Black Alert (1985)

Written as James Fraser
 The Evergreen Death (1968)
 A Cock-Pit of Roses (1969)
 Deadly Nightshade (1970)
 Death in a Pheasant's Eye (1971)
 Blood on a Widow's Cross (1972)
 The Five-Leafed Clover (1973)
 A Wreath of Lords and Ladies (1974)
 Who Steals My Name? (1976)
 Hearts Ease in Death (1977)

Written as Bill Reade
 What Have They Done to You, Ben? (1967)
 I wonder What Happened to Tom? (1968)
 A Bomb for Atuna (1975)
 The Ibiza Syndicate (1975)

Written as Alec Haig
 Sign on for Tokyo (1968)
 Flight from Montenegro Bay (1972)
 Peruvian Printout (1974)

Written as Alec Whitney
 Every Man Has His Price (1968)
 The Triple Zero (1971)

Written as Joe Balham
 The Sweeney: Regan and the Lebanese Shipment (1977)
 The Sweeney: Regan and the Human Pipeline (1977)
 The Sweeney: Regan and the Bent Stripper (1977)
 The Sweeney: Regan and the Snout Who Cried Wolf (1977)
 The Sweeney: Regan and the Venetian Virgin (1978)
 The Sweeney: Regan and the High Rollers (1978)
 Sweeney 2: The Blag (1978)
 Desert Command (1979)

Sources

1924 births
2003 deaths
20th-century English male writers
20th-century English novelists
English male journalists
English mystery writers
Writers from Yorkshire
English male novelists
British Army personnel of World War II
British Army Commandos soldiers
Military personnel from Yorkshire